Roland Wommack (December 27, 1936 – May 22, 2018) was an American fencer. He competed in the team épée event at the 1960 Summer Olympics.

References

External links
 

1936 births
2018 deaths
American male épée fencers
Olympic fencers of the United States
Fencers at the 1960 Summer Olympics
Fencers from Philadelphia
Pan American Games medalists in fencing
Pan American Games gold medalists for the United States
Fencers at the 1959 Pan American Games